Yengejeh-ye Daliganlu (also Romanized as Yengejeh-ye Dalīgānlū; also known as Qeshlāq-e Yengejeh, Yengejeh-ye Dalīkānlū, and Yengejeh-ye Qeshlāq) is a village in Garmeh-ye Shomali Rural District, Kandovan District, Meyaneh County, East Azerbaijan Province, Iran. At the 2006 census, its population was 374, in 73 families.

References 

Populated places in Meyaneh County